Lissus or Lissos was a town on the south coast of ancient Crete, which the anonymous Stadiasmus Maris Magni places between Syia and Calamyde. The Peutinger Table gives 16 M.P. as the distance between Cantanum and Lissus (there recorded as Liso). It was one of the harbours (the other was Syia) of Elyrus. It was established in the Classical period and flourished until the Late Antiquity. Its name was made certain by inscriptions. The early history of the city is unknown. Based on inscriptions and coins of the 3rd century BCE, we know the city allied with King Magas of Cyrene, and joined the League of Oreians. The koinon of the Oreians consisted of the cities Lissus, Syia, Poikilassos, Tarrha, Yrtakina and Elyrus. Lissus had powerful trading and fishing fleets.

This Cretan city was an episcopal see in the time of Hierocles. The order in which Flaminius Cornelius mentions it with the other bishoprics in the west part of the island agrees very well with its actual location in Agios Kirikos area, near the small village of Sougia, 70 km south of Chania.

Of all the towns which existed on this part of the coast, Lissus alone seems to have struck coins, a fact which agrees very well with the evidence supplied by its situation, of its having been a place of some trading importance. The harbour is mentioned in the Periplus of Pseudo-Scylax, and the types of the coins are either maritime, or indicative of the worship of Dictynna, as might have been expected on this part of the island. The obverse of one coin bears the impress of the caps and stars of the Dioscuri, and its reverse a quiver and arrow. On the second coin the caps and stars are replaced by a dolphin, and instead of the quiver a female head, probably that of Artemis or Dictynna. Lissus and Yrtakina were allies, and they had trading intercourse with common currency. Their coins had a dolphin or flying dove on the one side, and eight-ray star with the word L/I/S/I/O/N (of the Lisians) on the other.

Situation and archaeology 

This place occupies a small hollow of the hills facing the sea, like a theatre. Near the church of the Panaghia are what appear to be vestiges of an ancient temple, consisting of granite columns, and white marble fragments, architraves, and pediments. Further on, appears to have been another temple, and a theatre. The tombs are on the southwest side of the plain. They are worked independent of the rock, with arched roofs. There are perhaps fifty of them.

In 1957–58 the city was excavated by N. Platon. There were discovered ruins of a theatre, aqueduct, cemetery, and baths of the ancient times, and Palaeo-Christian basilicas. In the area, there were also found many votive objects, which are now exhibited at the Archaeological Museums of Heraklion and Chania. In no other city of Crete, apart from Gortys, there were found so many pieces of sculpture. This fact testifies the prosperity and the power of the Asclepieum of Lissus. Beside the Asclepieum and the Roman necropolis there are also two Greek Orthodox churches: Agios Kyrikos has some nice frescoes, and the chapel of Panagia is built with ancient marble blocks.

The small beach is a coarse pebble beach. Nobody lives in Lissus nowadays. It is reachable from Sougia by boat or by foot (90 minute walk).

See also 
 List of ancient Greek cities

References 

Populated places in ancient Crete
Chania (regional unit)
Port settlements in ancient Crete
Former populated places in Greece
Ancient Greek archaeological sites in Greece
Archaeological sites in Crete
1957 archaeological discoveries
1958 archaeological discoveries